Suffren was a wooden-hulled, armored frigate of the , built for the French Navy in the mid to late 1860s. Although she was laid down in 1866, the ship was not launched until 1870 and commissioned in 1876. Suffren was one of the French ships assigned to the international squadron gathered to force the Ottoman Empire to carry out its obligations under the Treaty of Berlin in 1880. The ship was paid off in 1895 and discarded two years later.

Design and description
The Océan-class ironclads were designed by Henri Dupuy de Lôme as an improved version of the s. The ships were central battery ironclads, with the armament concentrated amidships. For the first time in a French ironclad three watertight iron bulkheads were fitted in the hull. Like most ironclads of their era, they were equipped with a metal-reinforced ram.

Her crew numbered between 750 and 778 officers and men.

Propulsion
The Océan-class ships had one horizontal return connecting rod compound steam engine driving a single propeller. Their engines were powered by eight oval boilers. On sea trials the engine produced  and Suffren reached .

Armament
These ships had their main armament mounted in four barbettes on the upper deck, one gun at each corner of the battery, with the remaining guns on the battery deck below the barbettes. Suffrens armament was upgraded, before she commissioned, to four  guns in the barbettes, and on the battery deck, four  guns, six  guns and one  gun. By 1885, all of the 138-millimeter guns were replaced by six 120-millimeter guns.

The guns could fire both solid shot and explosive shells.

At some point the ship received a dozen  Hotchkiss 5-barrel revolving guns. They had a rate of fire of about 30 rounds per minute. The hull was not recessed to enable any of the guns on the battery deck to fire forward or aft. However, the guns mounted in the barbettes sponsoned out over the sides of the hull did have some ability to fire fore and aft.

Late in the ship's career, four above-water  torpedo tubes were added.

Armor
The Ocean-class ships had a complete  wrought iron waterline belt. The unarmored portions of their sides were protected by  iron plates. Gardiner says that the barbette armor was later removed to improve their stability, but this is not confirmed by any other source.

Service
Suffren was laid down at Cherbourg in July 1866, but was not launched until 26 December 1870. The ship began her sea trials on 15 January 1873 and was completed on 5 August. She was placed into reserve after her completion and was not commissioned until 1 March 1876 when she became flagship of the Cherbourg Division. Throughout her career Suffren was often used as a flagship because of her spacious admiral's quarters.

On 1 September 1880 the ship was assigned to the division that participated in the international naval demonstration at Ragusa later that month under the command of Vice Admiral Seymour of the Royal Navy in an attempt to force the Ottoman Empire to comply with the terms of the Treaty of Berlin and turn over the town of Ulcinj to Montenegro. Suffren was reduced to reserve in 1881 and not recommissioned until 23 August 1884 when she was assigned to the Northern Squadron. The ship was transferred to the Mediterranean Squadron about 1888 and remained there until paid off in 1895 and condemned in 1897.

Footnotes

References

External links
  classe Océan

Ships built in France
1870 ships
Océan-class ironclads